The Eleventh Federal Electoral District of the Federal District (XI Distrito Electoral Federal del Distrito Federal) is one of the 300 Electoral Districts into which Mexico is divided for the purpose of elections to the federal Chamber of Deputies and one of 27 such districts in the Federal District ("DF" or Mexico City).

It elects one deputy to the lower house of Congress for each three-year legislative period, by means of the first past the post system.

District territory
Under the 2005 districting scheme, the DF's Eleventh District covers the eastern half of the borough (delegación) of Venustiano Carranza and the eastern edge of Iztacalco.

Previous districting schemes

1996–2005 district
Between 1996 and 2005, the Eleventh District covered the eastern portion of  Venustiano Carranza only.

Deputies returned to Congress from this district

XLII Legislature
 1952–1955: Eugenio Ibarrola Santoyo (PAN)
XLIX Legislature
 1973–1976: Juan José Hinojosa (PAN)
L Legislature
 1976–1979: Jaime Aguilar Álvarez (PRI)
LI Legislature
 1979–1982: Manuel Germán Parra y Prado (PRI)
LII Legislature
 1982–1985: Enrique León Martínez (PRI)
LIII Legislature
 1985–1988:
LIV Legislature
 1988–1991: Patricia Garduño (PAN)
LV Legislature
 1991–1994:
LVI Legislature
 1994–1997: Alejandro Rojas Díaz Durán (PRI)
LVII Legislature
 1997–2000: Octavio Hernández Calzada (PRD)
LVIII Legislature
 2000–2003: Francisco Ramírez Cabrera (PAN)
LIX Legislature
 2003–2006: Alfonso Ramírez Cuéllar (PRD)
LX Legislature
 2006–2009: Víctor Hugo García Rodríguez (PRD)

References and notes

Federal electoral districts of Mexico
Mexico City